Sam Nixon (born 15 August 1996) is an English professional rugby union player who plays as a tighthead prop for Grenoble in France's Pro D2.  He previously played for Exeter Chiefs and Bath in Premiership Rugby. Also for Top 14 club Bayonne.
He started his Rugby career with London Scottish academy before joining Plymouth Albion in July 2016. He joined Bath in February 2017. A product of Millfield School.

Nixon was promoted from the Bath academy to the senior squad at the end of the 2018–19 Premiership Rugby season. He left Bath to sign for French side Bayonne in the Top 14 from the 2020–21 season.

On 13th August 2021 Nixon signed for Exeter Chiefs.

References

External links

1996 births
Living people
Bath Rugby players
English rugby union players
Rugby union players from Dorchester, Dorset
Rugby union props
Exeter Chiefs players
People educated at Millfield